András Botos (born March 6, 1952) is a retired boxer, who won a bronze medal in the men's featherweight division (– 57 kilograms) at the 1972 Summer Olympics.  He also competed at the 1976 Montreal Olympics as a lightweight boxer.

1972 Olympic results
Below is the record of András Botos, a Hungarian featherweight boxer who competed at the 1972 Munich Olympics:

Round of 64 - Defeated Nopparat Preecha of Thailand by decision, 5-0
Round of 32 - Defeated Michael Andrews of Nigeria by decision, 5-0
Round of 16 - Defeated Louis Self of United States by decision, 3-2
Quarterfinal - Defeated Royal Kobayashi of Japan by decision, 4-1
Semifinal - Lost to Boris Kuznetsov of Soviet Union by decision, 0-5 (was awarded a bronze medal)

1976 Olympic results
Below is the record of András Botos, a Hungarian lightweight boxer who competed at the 1976 Montreal Olympics:

 Round of 64: bye
 Round of 32: defeated David Ssensonjo (Uganda) by walkover
 Round of 16: defeated Georgios Agrimavakis (Greece) by decision, 4-1
 Quarterfinal: lost to Vassily Solomin (Soviet Union) by decision, 0-5

Life after boxing
He is currently the trainer of Hungarian boxer Vilmos Balog.

References
 

1952 births
Living people
People from Salgótarján
Olympic boxers of Hungary
Olympic bronze medalists for Hungary
Boxers at the 1972 Summer Olympics
Boxers at the 1976 Summer Olympics
Olympic medalists in boxing
Medalists at the 1972 Summer Olympics
Hungarian male boxers
Featherweight boxers
Sportspeople from Nógrád County